Best of 061122‒071122 is the first compilation album released by Swedish singer-songwriter Miss Li. Released on 25 December 2007, her fourth album in just over a year, the album debuted at No. 29 on the Swedish albums chart, but reached a peak at No. 11 in August 2008.

The first disc is a collection of Miss Li's singles and a few fan favorites, whereas the second disc consists of B-sides and previously unreleased material.

Track listing

Disc 1
 "Oh Boy" – 3:18
 "Let Her Go" – 2:19
 "I'm Sorry, He's Mine" – 2:55
 "Gotta Leave My Troubles Behind" – 2:27
 "Why Don't You Love Me" – 3:06
 "High on You" – 3:05
 "Kings & Queens" – 2:13
 "Seems Like We Lost It" – 2:58
 "Leave My Man Alone" – 4:23
 "Ba Ba Ba" – 3:08
 "Miss Li" – 4:23

Disc 2
 "I Can't Give You Anything" – 2:48
 "It Was a Partynight" – 3:10
 "Like a Holiday" – 3:12
 "Not the One I Need" – 3:10
 "I Thought I Knew You" – 2:43
 "Take Me Back" – 3:42
 "Good Morning" – 1:47
 "Upside Down" – 1:30

Charts

Weekly charts

Year-end charts

References

2007 greatest hits albums
Miss Li albums